Santosh Lal (4 December 1983 – 17 July 2013) was an Indian cricketer. He played eight first-class matches for Jharkhand between 2004 and 2008. He was a childhood friend of MS Dhoni, whom he taught how to play the helicopter shot. Lal died of pancreatitis aged 29.

References

External links

1983 births
2013 deaths
Indian cricketers
Jharkhand cricketers
People from Ranchi
Cricketers from Jharkhand
Deaths from pancreatitis